Wangtuan could refer to the following places in China:

Wangtuan, Lixin County (望瞳镇), town in Anhui
Wangtuan, Jing County, Hebei (王瞳镇)
Wangtuan, Wendeng (汪疃镇), town in Wendeng City, Shandong